Foster + Partners is a British architectural, engineering, and integrated design practice founded in 1967 as Foster Associates by Norman Foster. It is the largest architectural firm in the UK with over 1,800 employees in 16 locations worldwide.

History

Established by Norman Foster as Foster Associates in 1967, shortly after leaving Team 4, the firm was renamed Sir Norman Foster and Partners Ltd in 1992 and shortened to Foster & Partners Ltd in 1999 to more accurately reflect the influence of the other lead architects.

In 2007, the private equity company 3i took a stake in the practice. The practice regained complete ownership in June 2014 when the 140 partners bought it back.

In October 2021, Foster + Partners was bought by a Canadian private investment firm, Hennick & Company, for an undisclosed sum, making it the single biggest shareholder of the practice. Foster will retain a controlling interest.

Major projects
Major projects, by year of completion and ordered by type, are:

Masterplans
 More London, London, UK (1998–2000)
 Duisburg Inner Harbour, Germany (1991–2003)
 Trafalgar Square redevelopment, London, UK (1996–2003)
 Quartermile, Edinburgh, Scotland (2001–)
 Masdar City, Abu Dhabi, UAE (2007–)
 West Kowloon Cultural District, Hong Kong (2009)
 Thames Hub, UK (2011–)
 Central Square, Cardiff, Wales 
 Amaravati, India (under construction)

Bridges
 Millau Viaduct, the tallest bridge in the world (2004)
 Western Årsta Bridge, Sweden (1994/2005)
 Millennium Bridge, London, UK (1998–2002)

Government
 Reichstag building redevelopment, Berlin, Germany (1999)
 London City Hall, UK (2002)
 New Supreme Court Building, Singapore (2005)
 Palace of Peace and Reconciliation, Astana, Kazakhstan (2006)
 Buenos Aires City Hall (new headquarters), Buenos Aires, Argentina (2015)

Cultural
 Sainsbury Centre for Visual Arts, University of East Anglia, Norwich, UK (1978)
 Clyde Auditorium, part of the Scottish Exhibition and Conference Centre complex, Glasgow (1997)
 Sackler Galleries, Royal Academy of Arts, London, UK (1985–1991)
 Carré d'Art, Nîmes, France (1984–1993)
 American Air Museum, Imperial War Museum Duxford, UK (1997) – Stirling Prize
 Queen Elizabeth II Great Court redevelopment, British Museum, London, UK (2000)
 The Sage Gateshead, Gateshead, UK (1997–2004)
 The Zénith, Zénith de Saint-Étienne, Saint-Étienne, France (2004–2007)
 The Robert and Arlene Kogod Courtyard, Smithsonian Institution, National Portrait Gallery, Washington, D.C., US (2004–2007)
 Winspear Opera House, Dallas, US (2003–2009)
 Art of the Americas Wing, Museum of Fine Arts, Boston, Boston, US (1999–2010)
 Khan Shatyr Entertainment Center, Astana, Kazakhstan (2006–2010)
 Sperone Westwater Gallery, New York City, US (2008–2010)
 Extension to Lenbachhaus art museum, Munich, Germany (2013)
 OVO Hydro, Glasgow, Scotland (2004–2013)
 Datong Art Museum, China (2011–2022)

Higher education
 Kings Norton Library, Cranfield University, UK (1994)
 Faculty of Law, Cambridge, Cambridge, UK (1995)
 Faculty of Management (now known as Aberdeen Business School), The Robert Gordon University, UK (1998)
 Imperial College School of Medicine, Sir Alexander Fleming Building, London, UK (1994–1998)
 Center for Clinical Science Research, Stanford University Stanford, California, US (1995–2000)
 British Library of Political and Economic Science, London School of Economics, London, UK (1993–2001)
 Imperial College London, Flowers Building, London, UK (1997–2001)
 Faculty of Social Studies, University of Oxford, UK (1996–2002)
 James H. Clark Center, Stanford, California, US (1999–2003)
 Universiti Teknologi Petronas, Tronoh, Perak, Malaysia (2004)
 Tanaka Business School, renamed the Imperial College Business School, London, UK (2004)
 Free University of Berlin, Berlin, Germany (2005)
 Leslie Dan Faculty of Pharmacy, University of Toronto, Toronto, Canada (2006)
 Library, California State University Channel Islands, Camarillo, California, US (2000–2008)
 Yale School of Management, new campus, New Haven, US (2013)
 Masdar Institute of Science and Technology, Abu Dhabi, UAE (2007–2015)
 China Resources University, Shenzhen, China (2011–2016)
 Health Education Campus (HEC), Case Western Reserve University, Cleveland Clinic, Cleveland, Ohio, US (2015–2019), location of the first U.S. 2020 Presidential Debate between Donald Trump and Joe Biden.

Sport
 Wembley Stadium reconstruction, London, UK (2007)
 Lusail Iconic Stadium, Lusail, Qatar (2010)

Transportation
 Stansted Airport, Uttlesford, UK (1991)
 Metro Bilbao, Spain (1997) – Line 2 (2004)
 Hong Kong International Airport, Chek Lap Kok, Hong Kong (1998)
 Canary Wharf tube station, London, UK (1999)
 Expo MRT station, Singapore (2001)
 Dresden Hauptbahnhof redevelopment, Dresden, Germany (1997–2006)
 Beijing Capital International Airport, Beijing, China (2008)
 Heathrow Terminal 2, London, UK 
 Spaceport America, New Mexico, US (2005–2013)
 Four railway stations for the Haramain High Speed Rail Project, Saudi Arabia
 Kai Tak Cruise Terminal, Hong Kong (2013)
 Mexico City Texcoco Airport, Mexico (projected 2020)
 Slussenområdet redevelopment, Stockholm, Sweden (projected 2022)
 Queen Alia International Airport, Amman, Jordan (2005–2013)
 Thames Hub, UK (from 2011)
 Thames Hub Airport, UK (from 2013)
 Ocean Terminal extension, Hong Kong
 York University station – TYSSE, Vaughan, Ontario/Toronto, Canada (2017)
 Red Sea International Airport, Hanak, Saudi Arabia (2023)
 Techo Takhmao International Airport, Phnom Penh, Cambodia (2025)
 Solidarity Transport Hub or Central Communication/Transport Port, Baranów, Poland (2027)

Office
 Fred. Olsen Lines terminal, London Docklands, UK (1971)
 Willis Building, Ipswich, UK (1971–1975)
 HSBC Tower, Hong Kong (1986)
 Commerzbank Tower, Frankfurt, Germany (1997)
 Citigroup Centre, London, UK (1996–2000)
 8 Canada Square (global headquarters of HSBC Group, London, UK (1997–2002)
 30 St Mary Axe ('The Gherkin'), London, UK – Swiss Re headquarters (2004) – Stirling Prize
 McLaren Technology Centre, base for the McLaren Formula One team and McLaren Group, Woking, UK (2004)
 Deutsche Bank Place, Sydney (1997–2005)
 Hearst Tower, New York City, US (2006)
 Willis Building, London, UK (2001–2007)
 Torre Cepsa, Madrid, Spain (2002–2009)
 Apple Park (corporate headquarters of Apple Inc., Cupertino, California, US (2013–2017)
 Bloomberg London (European headquarters), London UK (2017) – Stirling Prize
 Varso Tower (the tallest building in Poland and in the European Union), Warsaw, Poland (2022)
 425 Park Avenue, New York City, US (2022)

Leisure
 The Great Glasshouse, National Botanic Garden of Wales, Wales, UK (1995–2000)
 Elephant House, Copenhagen Zoo#Foster's Elephant House, Copenhagen, Denmark (2002–2008)
 Dolder Grand restoration, Zürich, Switzerland (2002–2008)
 Faustino Winery Bodegas Faustino, Castilla y Leon, Spain (2007–2010)
 Le Dôme winery, Saint-Émilion, France (−2021)
 ME Hotel, ME by Meliá, London, UK (2004–2013)
 The Murray, Hong Kong (2018)

Mixed use
 Albion Riverside, London, UK (1998–2003)
 Al Faisaliyah Center, Riyadh, Saudi Arabia (1994–2000)
 The Index (Dubai), Dubai, UAE (2010)
 The Troika, Kuala Lumpur, Malaysia (2004–2011)
 The Bow, Calgary, Canada (2005–2013)
 Central Market Project, Abu Dhabi, UAE (2006–2013)
 One Central Park, Sydney, Australia (2012–2013)
 2 World Trade Center (formerly 200 Greenwich Street), New York City, US (predicted completion date 2022)
 CityCenterDC, Washington, D.C., US
 Crystal Island, Moscow, Russia (completion date not set yet)
 Hermitage Plaza, La Défense, Paris, France (from 2008)
 India Tower, Mumbai, India (cancelled)
 Oceanwide Center, San Francisco, US (predicted completion date 2021)
 Comcast Technology Center, Philadelphia, US (predicted completion date 2017)
 VietinBank Business Center Office Tower, Hanoi, Vietnam (predicted completion date 2017)
 Principal Place (including Principal Tower), London, UK (2017)
 Battersea Power Station Phase 3, London, UK (under construction)
 The One, Toronto, Canada (projected 2020)

Residential
The Murezzan, St Moritz, Switzerland (2003–2007)
Regent Place, Sydney, Australia (2003–2007)
 Jameson House, Vancouver, Canada (2004–2011)
 The Aleph, Buenos Aires, Argentina (2006–2013)
 Anfa Place, Casablanca, Morocco (2007–2013)
 Faena House, Miami Beach, US
 The Towers by Foster + Partners, Miami, US (2016)
 Arcoris Mont Kiara, Malaysia (projected 2016)
 100 East 53rd Street (formerly 610 Lexington Avenue), New York City, US (2019)
 50 United Nations Plaza, New York City, US (2015)
 Ocean Tower, Mumbai, India (projected 2022)
 The Estate Makati, Makati, Philippines (projected 2023)

Current
 Hall of Realms, Madrid, Spain (projected 2021)
 York University, Toronto, Canada (projected 2018)
 BBC Cymru Wales New Broadcasting House, Cardiff, Wales
 Amaravati, India (under construction)
 Shinagawa Triton Tower, Tokyo, Japan (under construction, projected to be completed in 2026)
 270 Park Avenue redevelopment, New York, United States (under construction)
 Transamerica Pyramid, San Francisco, United States (renovation)

Selected works

Awards 
 1998 RIBA Stirling Prize for Imperial War Museum
 2000 Welsh National Eisteddfod Gold Medal for the Great Glasshouse, National Botanic Garden of Wales
 2003 MIPIM AR Future Projects Award, Grand Prix for Swiss Re
 2004 RIBA Stirling Prize for Swiss Re
 2007 RIBA European Award for Dresden Station Redevelopment
 2007 RIBA International Award for Hearst Tower
 2007 Aga Khan Award for Architecture for University of Technology Petronas
 2008 2008 LEAF Award for Beijing Airport Terminal 3
 2009 RIBA European Award for Zenith
 2009 2009 RIBA International Award for Beijing Airport Terminal 3
 In June 2011, The Index Tower was the recipient of the 2011 Best Tall Building Middle East & Africa award by the Council on Tall Buildings and Urban Habitat
 2010 RIBA International Award for Winspear Opera House
 2011 RIBA International Award for Masdar Institute
 2011 RIBA International Award for Boston Museum of Fine Arts
 2013 RIBA International Award for Faena Aleph Residences
 2013 RIBA International Award Central Market Project
 2013 RIBA Award 7 More London More London
 2013 Best Bar, Restaurant & Bar Design Awards for Atrium Champagne Bar, London, UK
 2014 RIBA International Award for Marseille Vieux Port
 2016 RIBA International Award for Buenos Aires Ciudad Casa de Gobierno
 2017 RIBA National Award for Maggie's at the Robert Parfett Building
 2018 RIBA Awards for International Excellence for Xiao Jing Wan University 
 2018 Stirling Prize for Bloomberg London, UK
 World Winners Prix Versailles 2018

Criticism
In June 2008, The Guardian published an article highly critical of planned real estate development in a pristine seacoast area in Bulgaria which is currently under EU environmental protection. The paper cited environmentalists' concerns over the impact of the planned 15,000 inhabitant resort facilities. The Bulgarian partner, Georgi Stanishev, is the brother of Sergei Stanishev, Leader of Bulgarian socialist Party, Prime Minister of Bulgaria between 17 August 2005 and 27 July 2009.

See also 
 List of architecture firms
 List of architects
 Spencer de Grey
 Mouzhan Majidi
 Richard Rogers
 Roy Fleetwood
 SkyCycle (proposed transport project)

References

External links 

 Foster + Partners Website
 
 Antoinette Nassopoulos, Foster + Partners 'Virgin Red Hot Design' talk(Video)
 Foster + Partners publications at Archidust

Architecture firms based in London
Norman Foster, Baron Foster of Thames Bank
•
Stirling Prize laureates
Welsh Eisteddfod Gold Medal winners
Design companies established in 1967
1967 establishments in England
3i Group companies
Compasso d'Oro Award recipients

}}